Mascot Records is a record label and rock music subsidiary of Mascot Label Group.

Artists
10 Years
Agent Steel
Black Country Communion
Black Label Society
Black Stone Cherry
Bootsy Collins
Crobot
Conquer Divide
Dragged Under
Dublin Death Patrol
Gojira
Heathen
The Jelly Jam
Jordan Rudess
Levara
Monster Truck
Nine Shrines
Pestilence
P.O.D.
Shaman's Harvest
Steve Lukather
Tracer
Vandenberg's MoonKings
Volbeat
Yngwie Malmsteen

External links
 Official Website
 Youtube

References

Dutch record labels
Rock record labels